Vahdat Football Club (Persian: باشگاه فوتبال وحدت, Bashgah-e Futbal-e Vâhdât) was an Iranian football club based in Tehran, Iran that participated in Tehran Football League from 1980s. Vahdat ّFC was founded in 1973.

References

Football clubs in Iran
Sport in Tehran
1936 establishments in Iran